A. portoricensis may refer to:

 Acalypha portoricensis, a plant with nettle-like leaves
 Aeschynomene portoricensis, a flowering plant
 Alchorneopsis portoricensis, a plant native to Puerto Rico
 Amphinectria portoricensis, a fungus with pseudoparaphyses
 Anemia portoricensis, a flowering fern
 Antirhea portoricensis, a plant endemic to Puerto Rico
 Apenes portoricensis, a ground beetle
 Aristida portoricensis, a grass endemic to Puerto Rico